Erlick is a surname. It could be referring to:

 Eli Erlick (born 1995), American activist and writer
 Myles Erlick (born 1998), Canadian actor, dancer and singer